Braedon Clark (born 25 April 1988) is a Canadian politician, who was elected to the Nova Scotia House of Assembly in the 2021 Nova Scotia general election. He represents the riding of Bedford South as a member of the Nova Scotia Liberal Party. Clark is a member of the Human Resources Committee and the Law Amendments Committee.

Prior to becoming an MLA, Mr. Clark worked as a political assistant and in public relations.

Electoral record

References

1988 births
Living people
Nova Scotia Liberal Party MLAs
21st-century Canadian politicians
People from Bedford, Nova Scotia